Jan Poulie (1907 – 10 December 1981) was a Dutch philatelist who was added to the Roll of Distinguished Philatelists in 1960.

References

Signatories to the Roll of Distinguished Philatelists
1907 births
1981 deaths
Dutch philatelists